The Spokane, Portland & Seattle Railway (SP&S)  was a railroad in the northwest United States. Incorporated in 1905, it was a joint venture by the Great Northern Railway and the Northern Pacific Railway to build a railroad along the north bank of the Columbia River. Remnants of the line are currently operated by BNSF Railway and the Portland and Western Railroad.

History

The railroad was chartered in 1905 by James J. Hill to connect the two transcontinental railroads owned by him, the Northern Pacific (NP) and Great Northern (GN), to Portland, Oregon from Spokane, Washington, to gain a portion of the lumber trade in Oregon, a business then dominated by E.H. Harriman's Union Pacific and Southern Pacific railroads. Construction began in 1906 under the name Portland & Seattle Railway, proceeding to the east and south from Vancouver, Washington. The work included construction of three major bridges over the Columbia River, the Oregon Slough, and the Willamette River. The northernmost of these was the first bridge of any kind to be built across the lower Columbia River.

Despite legal challenges from Harriman, within a year the line had been built as far as Pasco along the Columbia River, where it connected with NP. Operation was extended west to Lyle,  further west, on January 15, 1908, as construction continued on the  section from Pasco to Vancouver.

In January 1908 "Spokane" was added to the railroad's name, making it the Spokane, Portland & Seattle Railway. SP&S freight and passenger service (from Pasco) to Portland was inaugurated in November 1908. By 1909 the railroad had completed construction of its line up to Spokane along the Snake River. In 1910 SP&S gained control of the Oregon Electric interurban railway, which the Great Northern had acquired two years before. Under the control of the SP&S the railroad was extended southward to Eugene by 1912. SP&S also operated a second subsidiary railroad in western Oregon, the Oregon Traction Company, which owned a route along the south bank of the Columbia River, through Astoria to Seaside.

A third route on which the SP&S operated extended southward from Wishram, Washington, to Bend, Oregon, was the Oregon Trunk Railway Company. Edward Harriman's Oregon & Washington Railway & Navigation Company also was building a railroad south from the Columbia River to Bend resulting in a railroad war in which each railroad attempted to sabotage the other. In the end, the railroad opened using mostly the track of the Oregon Trunk, with a short portion of the Oregon & Washington Railway & Navigation Company track, and both railroads used the route (an arrangement that still exists with BNSF owning the majority of the line and UP having trackage rights).

During World War II the SP&S carried war materials to the Pacific Theatre; new industries located along the Columbia River, taking advantage of cheap electricity from hydroelectric dams on the river.  New industries served by the SP&S included aluminum plants, sawmills, chemical factories and grain elevators.

In 1954, a SP&S train derailed after hitting a rockslide on the route to Bend, Oregon, killing all crew members. Part of the train landed in the Deschutes River, including a boxcar, which landed in a rapid that was later named "Boxcar Rapids" after the incident.

Passenger trains 

The SP&S's passenger operations mostly involved hosting connections with parents' trains, such as the Empire Builder and North Coast Limited, which were combined to form the Streamliner (#1/#2). Oriental Limited, Mainstreeter, and Western Star connected with (#3/#4).  However, some of these SP&S trains were named. The Inland Empire Express (daytime) and North Bank Limited (overnight) provided daily, through service between Portland (Union Station) and Spokane. The Columbia River Express (#5/#6) operated between Portland and Pasco, connecting at Pasco with Northern Pacific #5/#6 for service to/from Spokane.

The only surviving SP&S Business car, the #99 or "The Ruth M." is in operating condition, and resides at the Chehalis–Centralia Railroad. The car is used as "premier seating", and during dinner trains can host a private party of up to eight in its lounge and dining room. The car is in need of several cosmetic and mechanical repairs including a rebuild of its HVAC system to run on electricity/generator, there are several rust holes that need to be filled, and the car needs to be sandblasted and repainted. The SP&S Historical Society is assisting with the repaint efforts.

Preservation 
Preserved steam locomotives:

 Spokane, Portland and Seattle 700 - A 4-8-4 preserved and operational in Portland, Or.
 Spokane, Portland and Seattle 539 - A 2-8-2 preserved on static display.

See also 

 North Bank Depot Buildings – Portland terminal for SP&S service, 1908–1920s
 Spokane, Portland and Seattle Railroad Warehouse
 Spokane, Portland and Seattle Railway Roster

References

Further reading

External links

Spokane Portland and Seattle Railway Historical Society

 
Predecessors of the Burlington Northern Railroad
Former Class I railroads in the United States
Defunct Washington (state) railroads
Defunct Oregon railroads
Railway companies established in 1908
Railway companies disestablished in 1979
Joint ventures
1908 establishments in the United States
Standard gauge railways in the United States